OCPP may refer to:
Oregon Center for Public Policy, an Oregonian economic research organization
Open Charge Point Protocol, an open protocol